Permanent Vacation may refer to:

A slang term for a layoff

Film and television
Permanent Vacation (1980 film), written and directed by Jim Jarmusch, starring Chris Parker
Permanent Vacation (2007 film), a dark comedy by W. Scott Peake
"Permanent Vacation" (CSI: Miami episode), an episode of CSI: Miami

Music
 Permanent Vacation (Aerosmith album), 1987 
 Permanent Vacation 3x5, a 1988 Aerosmith video
 Permanent Vacation Tour, a 1987–1988 Aerosmith concert tour
 Permanent Vacation (Lime Cordiale album), 2017

Songs
 "Permanent Vacation", by 5 Seconds of Summer from the 2015 album Sounds Good Feels Good
"Permanent Vacation", by R.E.M. on the 2004 album iTunes Originals – R.E.M.